The Ukrainian National Badminton Championships is a tournament organized to crown the best badminton players in Ukraine.

The tournament started in 1992 and is held every year.

Past winners

References
Details of affiliated national organisations at Badminton Europe
Чемпионы Украины с 1992 г. по 2020 at fbubadminton.org.ua

Badminton tournaments in Ukraine
National badminton championships
Sports competitions in Ukraine
Recurring sporting events established in 1992
1992 establishments in Ukraine
Badminton